Zuo Qiuming, Zuoqiu Ming or Qiu Ming (556–451 BCE or 502 – 422 BCE) was a Chinese historian who was a contemporary of Confucius that lived in the State of Lu during the Spring and Autumn period of ancient China. He is a historian, litterateur, thinker, essayist and worked as a historical official of Lu.

The influential historical narrative Zuozhuan ("Commentary of Zuo") is traditionally attributed to him; as well as Guoyu ("Discourses of the States"). One tradition, according to the Records of the Grand Historian, holds that he was blind.

In the Analects, Confucius complimented Zuo Qiu Ming's moral stance and conducts; he also received praises for his academic contributions.

Ideology 
The basic philosophical outlook of Zuo Zhuan, attributed to Zuo Qiu Ming, is strongly Confucian in nature. The Zuo Zhuan overarching theme is that haughty, evil, and stupid people generally bring disaster upon themselves, while those who are good, wise, and humble are usually justly rewarded. The Confucian principle of "ritual propriety" or "ceremony" (lǐ ) is seen as governing all actions, including war, and to bring bad consequences if transgressed. However, the observance of li is never shown as guaranteeing victory, and the Zuo Zhuan includes many examples of the good and innocent suffering senseless violence. Much of the Zuo Zhuan′s status as a literary masterpiece stems from its "relentlessly realistic portrayal of a turbulent era marked by violence, political strife, intrigues, and moral laxity".

The narratives of the Zuo Zhuan are highly didactic in nature, and are presented in such a way that they teach and illustrate moral principles. Unlike the Histories of Herodotus or the History of the Peloponnesian War of Thucydides, with which it is roughly contemporary, the Zuo Zhuan′s narration always remains in the third person perspective, and presents as a dispassionate recorder of facts. The German Sinologist Martin Kern observed: "Instead of offering authorial judgments or catechistic hermeneutics, the Zuo Zhuan lets its moral lessons unfold within the narrative itself, teaching at once history and historical judgment."

For instance, here Zuo Zhuan instructed how a  should behave.

Publications 
Zuo Zhuan and Guoyu were both attributed to Zuo Qiuming.

Zuo Zhuan 
Zuo Zhuan is the earliest, detailed, vividly narrated chronological history in china. At the same time, it is also a historical narrative with high literary quality. ("我国古代最早而又详细完备，叙事生动的编年史，同时也是文学成就很高的历史散文著作。")

Guo Yu 
Sima Qian first proposed that Zuo Qiuming was the author of Guoyu. Tang scholar Yan Shigu, while annotating Book of Han, also attributed Guoyu's authorship to Zuo Qiu Ming. Later other scholars doubted it and had different opinions on who is the author of Guo Yu, one example is Fu Xuan, who first raised the counterview that Zuo Qiuming isn't the author of Zuo Zhuan.

Guo Yu's compilation method is based on the classification of countries, in Chinese Guo; taking language, in Chinese Yu as the core, hence receives the name Guo Yu. ("它的编纂方法是以国分类，以语为主，故名'国语'.") Guo Yu is the first Chinese history book in national style. ("国语是第一部国别体史书。")

Historical Evaluations 

Zuo Qiu Ming is regarded as "the ancestor of hundreds of characters, the ancestor of ancient literature". ("百家文字之宗、万世古文之祖")

Notes

References

Sources

5th-century BC Chinese writers
5th-century BC historians
6th-century BC Chinese writers
Historians from Shandong
Lu (state)
Zhou dynasty historians